Javier Antonio Cohene Mereles (born 3 May 1987) is a professional footballer who played as a centre back for the Palestine national team. Born and raised in Paraguay, some of his ancestors came from Bethlehem.

Club career
After several short spells with General Díaz, and Brazilian clubs Gaúcho and Passo Fundo, Cohene moved to Europe to play in Portugal for second division side S.C. Olhanense, where he would remain for two seasons before moving back to South America to play for River Plate and Sportivo Luqueño.

In the summer of 2010, Cohene returned to Portugal to play for F.C. Paços de Ferreira. His first two, of his three seasons with Os Castores proved to be successful as he featured regularly in Paços' defense alongside Ricardo in the 2010–11 season, and Ozéia in the 2011–12 season. His first two seasons saw him make 60 appearances, and contributing six goals in the process. His first season with Paços de Ferreira would see Cohene help his side reach the 2011 Taça da Liga Final, where his side were defeated by Benfica.

The arrival of Paulo Fonseca at the Mata Real for the 2012–13 season saw Cohene feature less than previous seasons. He was primarily used as a back up to Ricardo and Tiago Valente, and would only feature regularly in domestic cup competitions. Despite Paços de Ferreira's historic third place league finish which granted qualification to the 2013–14 UEFA Champions League play-off round, Cohene left Paços in the summer of 2013.

Following his departure from Os Pacenses, Cohene signed for Vitória de Setúbal. He debuted for Os Sadinos on the 18 August against Porto. Cohene would score his first goal since arriving at Vitória on the 31 August, against Vitória de Guimarães in a 4–1 away win.

In Summer 2014, he moved for first time outside his comfort zone, which has been Latin America and the Iberian peninsula, and moved to South-eastern Europe, where he signed a contract with Serbian SuperLiga side FK Borac Čačak.

On following summer, he and Borac decided to terminate contract by mutual agreement, and Cohene left Serbia but did stayed in Europe, only hat this time he was back to Portugal, and, on 1 August 2015, Cohene joined Atlético CP.

International career
Cohene committed to the Palestinian national team where he was eligible to play because of his Palestinian grandmother. Known as Javier Mereles when playing for Palestine, he received his first call-up by Jamal Mahmoud for the Peace Cup taking place in September 2014. He scored his first goal on his debut against Chinese Taipei on 6 September 2014.

International goals
Scores and results list Palestine's goal tally first.

References

External links
 
 
 
 

1987 births
Living people
People from Paraguarí
Paraguayan footballers
Palestinian footballers
Palestine international footballers
Association football defenders
General Díaz footballers
Liga Portugal 2 players
S.C. Olhanense players
Argentine Primera División players
Club Atlético River Plate footballers
Paraguayan Primera División players
Sportivo Luqueño players
Primeira Liga players
F.C. Paços de Ferreira players
Vitória F.C. players
FK Borac Čačak players
Serbian SuperLiga players
Palestinian expatriate footballers
Paraguayan expatriate footballers
Expatriate footballers in Brazil
Paraguayan expatriate sportspeople in Brazil
Palestinian expatriate sportspeople in Brazil
Expatriate footballers in Portugal
Palestinian expatriate sportspeople in Portugal
Expatriate footballers in Argentina
Paraguayan expatriate sportspeople in Argentina
Palestinian expatriate sportspeople in Argentina
Expatriate footballers in Serbia
Palestinian expatriate sportspeople in Serbia
Paraguayan people of Palestinian descent